Downing College Boat Club (or DCBC) is the rowing club for members of Downing College, Cambridge.  Downing men have not been below the top 9 boats for over 3 decades, on occasion being the only boat club with a second boat in the first division, and regularly ahead of other college first boats. Downing women also consistently place highly, currently second on the river in the Lents and sixth in the Mays.

History
Despite the college admitting undergraduates in 1821, Downing's boat club did not form until 1863, with their first race being in the spring of 1864. The men's 1st VIII did not feature regularly in the 1st division of the Lent and May Bumps until the 1960s. The club first became Head of the Mays in 1982, a position it lost in 1983 and regained in 1984. The head crew was coached by Downing alumnus Graeme Hall, who was the stroke of the Cambridge crew which won The Boat Race 1968 and The Boat Race 1969, and coached the British Men's VIII to win the silver medal in Rowing at the 1980 Summer Olympics.

Downing women formed in 1981 and held their first headship of the Lent Bumps from 2004–2005, regaining it in 2011, and attained their first headship of the May Bumps in 2011. They retained both headships in 2012. In 2020 Downing women regained headship position after starting 4th on the river.

The club has now held 16 headships in total, including a double-headship in 1996.

In 2018, the first indoor rowing training tank in the East of England was built in the Club's boathouse.

Gallery

References

External links
 CUCBC/ Cambridge University Combined Boat Club
 Downing College Boat Club

Rowing clubs of the University of Cambridge
Boat Club
1863 establishments in England
Sports clubs established in 1863
Rowing clubs in Cambridgeshire
Rowing clubs in England
Rowing clubs of the River Cam